South is the fourth studio album by Heather Nova. There were two versions of this album—the original release on December 11, 2001, and an American release on May 21, 2002. The US release contained one extra track, "Welcome", which also appeared on the 2005 album Redbird. "Virus of the Mind" was released as a single in the United States.

The album was recorded in London, New York, Sweden and Los Angeles and featured Bernard Butler on some of the tracks.

For this album, Nova also recorded a contemporary-styled cover of the standard "Gloomy Sunday", a song originally made popular by Billie Holiday. In retrospect, Nova found the album to be far too polished and not entirely to her liking. She declared that her next album, Storm, would be bare and would be the album she's always wanted to make.

Track listing
All songs by Heather Nova, except where noted.

European release
"If I Saw You in a Movie" – 4:06; produced by Felix Tod
"Talk to Me" – 4:05; produced by Felix Tod
"Virus of the Mind" – 4:13; produced by Paul Fox
"Like Lovers Do" – 4:11; produced by Eve Nelson
"Waste the Day" – 3:34; produced by Felix Tod
"Heaven Sent" – 4:14; produced by Peter Kvint and Simon Nordberg
"It's Only Love" – 4:34; produced by Felix Tod
"I'm No Angel" (Bernard Butler, Nova) – 3:58; produced by Bernard Butler and Felix Tod
"Help Me Be Good to You" – 3:53; produced by Felix Tod
"When Somebody Turns You On" – 3:46; produced by Felix Tod
"Gloomy Sunday" (Holman, Javor, Seress) – 4:09; produced by D.F. Petersen
"Tested" – 3:26; produced by Felix Tod
"Just Been Born" – 4:30; produced by Felix Tod
"The Man in the Ocean - 4:41; Japan bonus track

U.S. release
"Welcome" (Armstrong, Campbell, Nova) – 4:19; produced by The Matrix
"If I Saw You in a Movie" – 4:04
"Talk to Me" – 4:05
"Heaven Sent" – 4:14
"Help Me Be Good to You" – 3:51
"Like Lovers Do" – 4:05
"Virus of the Mind" – 4:13
"It's Only Love" – 4:34
"When Somebody Turns You On" – 3:43
"Waste the Day" – 3:31
"I'm No Angel" (Bernard Butler, Nova) – 3:49
"Tested" – 3:26
"Gloomy Sunday" (Holman, Javor, Seress) – 4:09
"Just Been Born" – 4:30

B Sides
"Sweet November" ""I'm No Angel" single & "Virus of the Mind" single
"Paint the World" "Virus of the Mind" single
"In the Garden" "I'm No Angel" single
"Tested" (band version) "I'm No Angel" single
"Man in the Ocean" "I'm No Angel" single

Personnel
Heather Nova – vocals, theremin, glockenspiel, acoustic guitar
Bryan Adams – guitar, backing vocals
Felix Tod – programming
Paul Pimsler – guitar
Hugh Elliott – drums
Eve Nelson – keyboards, drum programming
Davey Faragher – bass guitar
Mark Goldenberg – guitar
Jerker Odelholm – bass guitar
Corky James – guitar
Andreas Dahlback – drums, tambourine
Carol Steele – percussion
Simon Nordberg – programming
Peter Kvint – acoustic guitar, backing vocals, electric guitar
Art Hodge – programming
Mike Stanzilis – bass guitar
Glenn Scott – piano, Hammond organ
Berit Fridahl – guitar
Bernard Butler – guitar, electric piano
Steve Hansen – programming
Laurie Jenkins – drums, percussion
David Ayers – electric guitar, slide guitar
Bastian Juel – bass guitar, piano

Charts

References

2001 albums
Heather Nova albums
V2 Records albums
Pop rock albums
Soul albums